Danielle Evans (born Danielle Valore Evans) is an American fiction writer. She is a graduate of Columbia University and the University of Iowa.
In 2011, she was honored by the National Book Foundation as one of its "5 Under 35" fiction writers.
Before You Suffocate Your Own Fool Self, her first short story collection, won the 2011 PEN/Robert Bingham Prize. 
The collection's title echoes a line from "The Bridge Poem," from Kate Rushin's collection The Black Back-Ups (Firebrand Books, 1993). Reviewing the book in The New York Times, Lydia Peelle observed that the stories "evoke the thrill of an all-night conversation with your hip, frank, funny college roommate."

Evans's work was anthologized in Houghton Mifflin Harcourt's Best American Short Stories collections in 2008, 2010, and 2017.
Her stories have also appeared in The Paris Review and A Public Space. In 2014 she became an assistant professor in the MFA program at the University of Wisconsin-Madison. Previously, she taught in the English department at American University. She now teaches at Johns Hopkins.

On July 17, 2020, Evans was featured on an episode of This American Life in the series "How to be alone", her audio segment being titled "The Unbearable Part".

The Office of Historical Corrections, a collection of seven stories, was released on November 10, 2020. It was a finalist for The Story Prize.

In April 2021, Evans won the Joyce Carol Oates Literary Prize.

References

External links 
 Danielle Evans interviewed by Emma Straub at the "5 Under 35" awards in Brooklyn, NY, November 14, 2011.
 Danielle Evans Reading From "Wherever You Go, There You Are" at NPR.
 Evans's story "Virgins", in The Paris Review, Fall 2007 issue
 Claire Kinnane, "A Conversation with Danielle Evans", College of Arts & Sciences, American University, January 7, 2010.
 Melinda Moustakis, "If You Lived Here: An Interview with Danielle Evans" , American Short Fiction, August 1, 2013.

1983 births
Living people
African-American short story writers
21st-century American women writers
21st-century American short story writers
University of Iowa alumni
University of Wisconsin–Madison faculty
American University faculty and staff
Columbia College (New York) alumni
American women academics
21st-century African-American women writers
21st-century African-American writers
20th-century African-American people
20th-century African-American women